Nothing is the fourth studio album by American rock band N.E.R.D, released November 2, 2010 on Star Trak Entertainment and Interscope Records in the United States. On October 17, 2010, the standard edition and the deluxe edition of the album became available for pre-order on iTunes.

Concept
"We needed to align ourselves and make ourselves parallel and congruent with what society is feeling," Williams tells Billboard.com. "There's a lot going on and a lot of things people don't necessarily understand. We have a Tea Party. We have conservative Democrats. We have liberals that are like neo-liberals and nothing like you thought they'd be. There's so many different hybrid sects of people and issues...

"So we thought why not make a timeless album that's kind of a time capsule, so 10 years from now people look at that album and go, 'I remember that era. That's when the 'Nothing' album came out.' I just wanted to make some good music that would affect people in a good way." Williams says it wasn't easy. N*E*R*D worked on "a previous body of work which was really good, but it wasn't timeless to me. I didn't feel like we were pushing ourselves as much as we could. We needed to perfect the sound, so we kept pushing the date back until it was right." The result includes "a lot of vintage sounds...The album is very '68-'72, '73, America meets Crosby, Stills & Nash meets Moody Blues."

Recording
The impetus was partially based on more wholeheartedly embracing digital audio workstation programs such as Logic Studio Pro, while using new tools to invoke a spirit of emotionally responsive late-'60s/early-'70s psychedelic pop with the final product.

Hugo had previously adopted many in-the-box techniques, and Williams always had a backpack to tote around various fashionable gadgetry, so adding in a Macbook Pro and portable MIDI controllers was no stretch. Certainly, not having a dozen pieces of outboard gear to have to relocate or rent (not to mention rewire) was a relief to Coleman and second engineer Mike Larson, who split N*E*R*D sessions between such facilities as South Beach Studios, Midnight Blue Studios in Miami, and The Neptunes' own Hovercraft Studios in Virginia Beach (Hugo's home base for mixing elements in to the base).

With ideas no longer waiting to be actualized with bodies sitting in front of the Korgs and beats synced to the Pro Tools clock, the composing of Nothing involved entire rhythm and chord progressions plus sequenced instrumentation ideas (courtesy of EXS24 virtual sampler libraries) being brought to Coleman's Pro Tools HD rig to form the bed of tracks. Monitoring with the Apogee Ensemble, the team would bounce the tracks down and import them, at which time Coleman would begin to apply signature tweaks to get a characteristic snap and thump.

The Access Virus TI still has a noticeable presence on Nothing, and live overdubs are blended into the programmed environment to reinforce it. Most often these guitar and bass licks come from Hugo, and sometimes Coleman, run into the Pro Tools DI, and then are processed through Line 6 Amp Farm and Tech21 SansAmp.

In short, Williams often lays down the initial patterns he has been playing out in his head (including everything from clavinet to handclaps), Hugo replays keys and adds tones such as "angry saxophone noise" (his description), and then Williams and Haley track lead vocals, harmonies, beatbox, and other percussive sounds. When needed, different drums are auditioned and triggered from disk, but there was no recording of additional live kits during the 2010 sessions. Finally, tone sculpting commences. "It's a different process [to be more virtual], and it does make some things easier," says Hugo. "There are also songs on the album that are more straightforward in rhythm, more four-on-the-floor, so there wasn't as much time in drum editing."

This time around, songwriting duties were shared between both Pharrell Williams and Chad Hugo, unlike their last effort Seeing Sounds where Williams had the majority of songwriting credits, with the exception of "Hot N' Fun", "Hypnotize U" (co written between Pharrell and Daft Punk) and "I Wanna Jam". (Co-written between Pharrell and Shae). However, "Ride That Thang" which features Fam-Lay, is co-written by Texas-born singer, Tanya Tucker, and Michael Paynter, whom both co-wrote the song, "Love the Fall" by Paynter.

Singles
"Hot-n-Fun" is the album's lead single released on May 18, 2010. It became a top 30 hit in Italy, Belgium, on the U.S. Hot Dance Club Songs chart and the UK R&B Chart.
"Hypnotize U" is the official second single released from the album. It was produced by Daft Punk and became available for download on iTunes on October 27.

Along with these singles, N*E*R*D has also released a few viral videos for 2 additional singles, one for "Help Me" and also for "Life as a Fish" which can be seen on the BBC Ice Cream website.

Reception

Commercial performance
The album debuted at number twenty one on the US Billboard 200 chart, with first-week sales of 20,000 copies.

Critical response

Nothing received mixed to positive reviews from most music critics. At Metacritic, which assigns a normalized rating out of 100 to reviews from mainstream critics, the album received an average score of 62, based on 19 reviews, which indicates "generally favorable reviews". Rave Magazine said, "Pharrell Williams should either stop letting his wang co-write his songs or start giving it a credit in the liner notes" and gave it two and a half stars out of five.

Track listing

Deluxe edition

Charts

Personnel
Credits for Nothing adapted from Allmusic

 Yaneley Arty – management
 Tom Bailey – assistant
 Thomas Bangalter – arranger, composer, musician
 Jason Carder – trumpet
 Lori Castro – assistant
 Clifford Harris – composer
 Andrew Coleman – arranger, digital editing, engineer, guitar (acoustic)
 Daft Punk – producer
 Guy-Manuel de Homem-Christo – arranger, composer, musician
 Demacio "Demo" Castellon – engineer
 Rhea Dummett – vocals, vocals (background)
 Cliff Feiman – production supervisor
 Geoff Foster – engineer
 Brian Gardner – mastering
 Matty Green – assistant

 Hart Gunther – assistant
 Chad Hugo – composer, saxophone
 Jimmy Iovine – composer, executive producer
 Martin Kierszenbaum – A&R
 Adam Larson – art direction, design
 Mike Larson – arranger, digital editing, engineer
 Guillermo Lefeld – assistant
 Daniel Lerner – engineer
 PJ McGinnis – assistant
 Alan Meyerson – mixing
 The Neptunes – producer
 Satoshi Noguchi – assistant
 Terry Richardson – photography
 Mark "Spike" Stent – mixing
 Pharrell Williams – composer, executive producer

Release history

References

2010 albums
Albums produced by the Neptunes
Albums produced by Jimmy Iovine
Albums produced by Thomas Bangalter
Albums produced by Guy-Manuel de Homem-Christo
N.E.R.D. albums
Star Trak Entertainment albums
Interscope Records albums